Coşkun Kırca (27 March 1927 in Istanbul – 24 February 2005 in Istanbul) was a Turkish diplomat, journalist and politician. He served as Minister of Foreign Affairs of Turkey in 1995. He was at first a member of the Republican People's Party (CHP), then of the Republican Reliance Party (CGP), then of the True Path Party (DYP).

Biography
He was born in Istanbul, Turkey in 1927. He attended the Galatasaray High School in Istanbul and graduated from the School of Law at Istanbul University.

On 12 March 1985 the Turkish embassy in Ottawa, where Kirca served as Ambassador, was attacked by Armenian Revolutionary Army militants. Kirca escaped by leaping from the second floor window at the back of the embassy, breaking his right arm, right leg and pelvis.  After the attack, he remained in Canada as ambassador for several years before returning to Turkey, where he served in many high-level state posts, including foreign minister (51st government of Turkey). When he was a member of Turkish Parliament for the DYP, he voiced support for lifting the parliamentary immunity of the pro-Kurdish parliamentarians of the People's Labour Party (DEP).deeming it detrimental for the Turkish nation to leave them within the "democratic process".

Kirca died of a heart attack in Istanbul at the age of 77. He was buried at the Feriköy Cemetery, Istanbul the next day, almost exactly 20 years after his brush with death in Ottawa. He was married and had 3 children. He was one of the founders of Galatasaray University.

See also
List of ambassadors of Turkey to Canada

References

1927 births
Diplomats from Istanbul
Republican People's Party (Turkey) politicians
Republican Reliance Party politicians
20th-century Turkish politicians
Democrat Party (Turkey, current) politicians
Ministers of Foreign Affairs of Turkey
Deputies of Istanbul
Permanent Representatives of Turkey to NATO
Permanent Representatives of Turkey to the United Nations
Ambassadors of Turkey to Canada
Turkish journalists
Galatasaray High School alumni
Istanbul University Faculty of Law alumni
2005 deaths
Burials at Feriköy Cemetery
Members of the 51st government of Turkey
Members of the 52nd government of Turkey
Ministers of State of Turkey
20th-century journalists